Alā ad-Dīn Kayqubād ibn Kaykhusraw (1190–1237), also known as Kayqubad I, was the Seljuq Sultan of Rûm who reigned from 1220 to 1237. He expanded the borders of the sultanate at the expense of his neighbors, particularly the Mengujek Beylik and the Ayyubids, and established a Seljuq presence on the Mediterranean with his acquisition of the port of Kalon Oros , later renamed Ala'iyya in his honor. The sultan, sometimes styled Kayqubad the Great, is remembered today for his rich architectural legacy and the brilliant court culture that flourished under his reign.

Kayqubad's reign represented the apogee of Seljuq power and influence in Anatolia, and Kayqubad himself was considered the most illustrious prince of the dynasty. In the period following the mid-13th century Mongol invasion, inhabitants of Anatolia frequently looked back on his reign as a golden age, while the new rulers of the Anatolian beyliks sought to justify their own authority through pedigrees traced to him.

Biography

Kayqubad was the second son of Sultan Kaykhusraw I, who bestowed upon him at an early age the title malik and the governorship of the important central Anatolian town of Tokat. When the sultan died following the battle of Alaşehir in 1211, both Kayqubad and his elder brother Kaykaus struggled for the throne. Kayqubad initially garnered some allies among the neighbors of the sultanate: Leo I, the king of Cilician Armenia and Tughrilshah, the brothers' uncle and the independent ruler of Erzurum. Most of the emirs, as the powerful landed aristocracy of the sultanate, supported Kaykaus. Kayqubad was forced to flee to the fortress at Ankara, where he sought aid from the Turkman tribes of Kastamonu. He was soon apprehended and imprisoned by his brother in a fortress in western Anatolia.

Upon Kaykaus' unexpected death in 1219 (or 1220), Kayqubad, released from captivity, succeeded to the throne of the sultanate.

In the Cilicia Campaign in 1225, Cilicia subjugated the Armenian Kingdom.

In 1221/1222 Kayqubad launched a naval attack on Sudak which defeated the combined forces of Rus and Cumans. He attack the Armenian Kingdom of Cilicia in 1221 taking the city of Alanya from its governor, Kir Fard.

In 1227/1228, Kayqubad advanced into Anatolia, where the arrival of Jalal ad-Din Mingburnu, who was fleeing the destruction of his Khwarezmian Empire by the Mongols, had created an unstable political situation. The sultan settled Turcomans along the Taurus Mountains frontier, in a region later called İçel. At the end of the 13th century, these Turcomans established the Karamanids. The Ayyubids, who were disturbed by the rapid expansion of Sultan Kayqubad I, especially in eastern Anatolia, took action against the sultan under the leadership of Al-Kamil in Egypt. In 1234 Kayqubad I completely defeated the allied Ayyubid forces. Afterward, Harput expanded its borders further in the south-east Anatolia region by capturing Siverek, Urfa, Harran and Raqqa. The sultan defeated the Artuqids and the Ayyubids and absorbed the Mengujek emirate into the sultanate, capturing the fortresses of Hısn Mansur, Kahta, and Çemişgezek along his march. He also put down a revolt by the Empire of Trebizond and, although he fell short of capturing their capital, forced the Komnenos dynasty family to renew their pledges of vassalage.

At first Kayqubad sought an alliance with his Turkish kinsman Jalal ad-Din Mingburni against the Mongol threat. The alliance could not be achieved, and afterwards Jalal ad-Din took the important fortress at Ahlat. Kayqubad finally defeated him at the Battle of Yassıçimen between Sivas and Erzincan in 1230. After his victory, he advanced further east, establishing Seljuq rule over Erzurum, Ahlat and the region of Lake Van (formerly part of Ayyubids). The Artuqids of Diyarbakır and the Ayyubids of Syria recognized his sovereignty. He also captured a number of fortresses in Georgia, whose queen sued for peace and gave her daughter Tamar in marriage to Kayqubad's son, Kaykhusraw II.

Mindful of the increasing presence and power of the Mongols on the borders of the Sultanate of Rum, he strengthened the defenses and fortresses in his eastern provinces. He was given poison during a feast at Kayseri and died at an early age on 31 May 1237, the last of his line to die in independence.

Historian Ibn Bibi mourned his death with these words,"With Kayqubad's death, the back of Islam was broken and the bond of kingdom and religion snapped".

Succession
Kayqubad had three sons: Kaykhusraw II, eldest son of his Greek wife Mah Pari Khatun, Rukn al-Din and Kilic Arslan, sons of his Ayyubid princess wife Malika Adila Khatun. According to Ibn Bibi, Kayqubad wanted Rukn al-Din as his successor who was the elder one of his two sons from his Ayyubid wife, Malika Adila Khatun, but Kaykhusraw usurped the throne and had Rukn al-Din, Kilic Arslan and their mother strangled.

Architectural and cultural legacy
Kayqubad sponsored a large scale building campaign across Anatolia. Apart from reconstructing towns and fortresses, he built many mosques, medreses, caravanserais, bridges and hospitals, many of which are preserved to this day. Besides completing the construction of the Seljuq Palace in Konya, he also built the Kubadabad Palace on the shore of Lake Beyşehir, Alanya Castle and Red Tower in Alanya and Kayqubadiyya Palace near Kayseri.

Kayqubad, like the other Seljuq sultans of Rum, was quite well versed in the fine arts and would recite quatrains in Persian during wine drinking parties.

Identity
According to Rustam Shukurov, it is very probably that Kayqubad and his brother Kaykaus I, who both spent considerable time in Byzantium with their father, had the same dual religious (Christian and Muslim) and dual ethnic (Turkic/Persian and Greek) identity as Kaykhusraw I, Kaykaus II, and Mesud II.

Relations with scholars
Kayqubad I had good relations with the Muslim scholars, Sufis and poets. Many Muslim Sufis and poets such as Mūhyūddīn İbnūl-Arābī, Abd al-Laṭīf al-Baghdādī, Ahi Evran, Necmeddīn-i Dāyē, Kāniî-i Tūsī, Shihab al-Din 'Umar al-Suhrawardi and Sultanulūlemā Bâhâeddīn Veled came to Anatolia during his reign.

Portrayal in media
In the Turkish historical television series, Diriliş: Ertuğrul, Kayqubad I is portrayed by Turkish actor Burak Hakkı.

References

Sources

Further reading

External links

Coins minted during the reign of Kayqubad I

Sultans of Rum
History of Alanya
1188 births
1237 deaths
Seljuk dynasty
13th-century Turkic people